Circo de estrellas, is the Chilean adaptation of an Australian TV program Celebrity Circus broadcast by the Australian Nine Network. It is based on learning and performing circus skills. The Chilean version of the program was announced in a January 2010 press release, to be shown by Televisión Nacional de Chile on Thursdays at 22:40 hours, hosted by Rafael Araneda and Karen Doggenweiler. There is also a related special program called asCirco behind the magic, which shows the trial participants in a kind of series-documentary.

The first episode, on 25 March 2010, attracted a rating of 16.2 points.

Mechanical
The celebrities who enter the program begin their studies at least a month before the airing of the program. They are assigned a professional teacher for the disciplines covered by the circus, who will be with them throughout the competition. They are observed and evaluated by five judges who give their opinion and score for each of the duelists. The contestant with fewest votes leaves the competition.

 Judges 
Fernando Sánchez: managerial of the Brothers Fuentes Gazca Company
Cristina Tocco: actress and singer
Gustavo Sánchez: former judge of Latin American IdolLuz Croxatto: actress and screenwriter
René O'Ryan: instructor of Pelotón III and Pelotón IV.

Competition table
{| class="wikitable" style="margin:auto;"
|-
!width="570"|Participants
!width="50"|Age
!width="175"|'Competition Status'|-
|bgcolor=""|Francisco "Chapu" Puelles''' - actor, contestant and double winner of Calle 7''
| align="center" |25
1st Place
|-
|bgcolor=""|Janis Pope - audiovisual communicator, panelist of En Portada
| align="center" |25
2nd Place (4th eliminated)
|-
|bgcolor=""|Loreto Aravena - actress in Los 80 series
| align="center" |26
3rd Placed6th & 8th eliminated
|-
|bgcolor=""|Nabih Chadud - engineer, former contestant in Pelotón and La Granja
| align="center" |33
1st, 5th & 10th eliminated
|-
|bgcolor=""|Monserrat Prats - actress
| align="center" |23
2nd & 9th eliminated
|-
|bgcolor=""|César Caillet - actor, lawyer
| align="center" |36
7th eliminated
|-
|bgcolor=""|Mariela Montero - actress, model, singer, former participant in Pelotón
| align="center" |30
3rd eliminated
|-
|bgcolor=""|Carla Ballero - actress, model, TV host
| align="center" |30
Retired (4)
|-
|bgcolor=""|Maite Orsini (1)(3) - actress, model, contestant in Calle 7 
| align="center" |22
Retired
|-
|bgcolor=""|Christian Ocaranza - dancer , former participant in Rojo Fama Contrafama
| align="center" |27 
Retired (2)
|}

(1) Alejandra Fosalba replaced due to leg injury by Maite Orsini. 
(2) Christian Ocaranza replaced due to back injury by Nabih Chadud on 15 April.
(3) Maite Orsini replaced due to personal problems by Janis Pope.
(4) Carla Ballero retired because she was pregnant.

Table of elimination

Repechaje stage
On May 6, 2010, it was the stage of the Repechaje where the contestants go through a task "Cuerda Floja". On this task were:

{| class="wikitable" style="margin:auto;"
|-
!width="175"|Participant
!width="175"|Result
|-
|bgcolor=""|Monserrat Prats
Back In
|-
|bgcolor=""|Loreto Aravena
Back In
|-
|bgcolor=""|Nabih Chadud
Back In
|-
|bgcolor=""|Mariela Montero
Eliminated
|-
|bgcolor=""|Maite Orsini
Eliminated
|}

Curiosities
 Francisco "Chapu" Puelles is the only finalist who was never eliminated.

References

Chilean reality television series